Residue may refer to:

Chemistry and biology 

 An amino acid, within a peptide chain
 Crop residue, materials left after agricultural processes
 Pesticide residue, refers to the pesticides that may remain on or in food after they are applied to food crops
 Petroleum residue, the heavier fractions of crude oil that fail to vaporize in an oil refinery
 Residue (chemistry), materials remaining after a physical separation process, or by-products of a chemical reaction

Mathematics 

 Residue (complex analysis), complex number describing the behavior of line integrals of a meromorphic function around a singularity
 Some coefficient involved in partial fraction decomposition
 A remainder in modular arithmetic

Other 

 A variant title of a British folk song also known as "Levy-Dew" and "New Year Carol"
 Residuum (geology), often used to refer to the soil and subsoil that forms as the result of long weathering over carbonate bedrock
 Residue (law), portion of the testator's estate that is not specifically devised to someone in the will
 Residue (TV series), an English science-fiction series from 2015
 Residual value, one of the constituents of a leasing calculus which describes the future value of a good in terms of absolute value

See also 

 Relic (disambiguation)
 Residual (disambiguation)